Aenigmabonus kurilokamtschaticus is a species of very small, deep water sea snail, a marine gastropod mollusk in the family Bathyphytophilidae, the false limpets.

Habitat
This species is found in the following habitats:
 Brackish
 Marine

References

External links
 To World Register of Marine Species

Bathyphytophilidae
Gastropods described in 1978